Thomas Bernard Elliott (29 March 1901 – 11 June 1974) was a former Australian rules footballer who played with Melbourne in the Victorian Football League (VFL).

Death
He died at a private hospital on 11 June 1974.

Notes

External links 
 
 
 Tom Elliott, at Demonwki.
 "Elliott, _Cbg25", at The VFA Project.
 Thomas Elliott, at The VFA Project.

1901 births
Australian rules footballers from New South Wales
Melbourne Football Club players
Coburg Football Club players
Camberwell Football Club players
Camberwell Football Club coaches
1974 deaths
Australian rules footballers from Victoria (Australia)